Kau Keng Shan (Cantonese: 九逕山, Yale romanisation: gáu ging shāan) is a hill in Tuen Mun, the New Territories, Hong Kong and stands opposite from Castle Peak. During the Ming dynasty era (1368–1644), the area around the hill was used as a defence position against foreign forces, in particular the Portuguese, who had occupied Tuen Mun from 1514 to 1521 (see Tamão).

See also 
List of mountains, peaks and hills in Hong Kong
Castle Peak
Tuen Mun

References 

Mountains, peaks and hills of Hong Kong
Tuen Mun District
Military of Hong Kong